Davy Commeyne (born 14 May 1980 in Roeselare) is a Belgian cyclist riding for Smartphoto.

Palmarès

1998
1st Ledegem-Kemmel-Ledegem
2000
2nd Omloop Het Nieuwsblad Beloften
2001
1st Spar Arden Challenge
1st stage 1
2008
1st stage 5 Bałtyk–Karkonosze Tour
2009
1st Tweedaagse van Gaverstreek
1st stage 1
1st stage Mi-Août Bretonne
1st Memorial Danny Jonckheere
3rd Triptyque Ardennais
1st stage 3
2011
1st Omloop Mandel-Leie-Schelde
2nd Druivenkoers Overijse
2012
2nd Dwars door het Hageland
3rd Internationale Wielertrofee Jong Maar Moedig
3rd Polynormande
2014
1st stages 2 and 4 Ronde van Vlaams-Brabant

References

1980 births
Living people
Belgian male cyclists
People from Roeselare
Cyclists from West Flanders